Esperança Real FC do Congo is an Angolan sports club from the city of Mbanza Congo, in the northern province of Zaire.
The team currently plays in the Gira Angola.

Achievements
Angolan League: 0

Angolan Cup: 0

Angolan SuperCup: 0

Gira Angola: 0

League & Cup Positions

Manager history

Players

See also
Girabola

References

External links
 Official blog
 Girabola.com Profile

Association football clubs established in 1978
Football clubs in Angola
Sports clubs in Angola